Franz Wanderer (20 February 1901 – 1944) was a German long-distance runner. He competed in the marathon at the 1928 Summer Olympics.

References

External links
 

1901 births
1944 deaths
People from Ilmenau
People from Saxe-Weimar-Eisenach
German male long-distance runners
German male marathon runners
Olympic athletes of Germany
Athletes (track and field) at the 1928 Summer Olympics
German military personnel killed in World War II
Sportspeople from Thuringia
20th-century German people